Mohammad Farid Hamidi (به فارسی و پشتو: څارنپوه محمدفرید حمیدی), born in 1967 in Nangarhar province of Afghanistan, is an Afghan lawyer, human rights activist, and was the Attorney General of Afghanistan from 2016 till 2021.

Early life and education 
Mohammad Farid Hamidi was born in 1967 in Nangarhar province in eastern Afghanistan. He completed his primary education in a local school. Afterwards he was admitted to the National Police Academy of Afghanistan, where he received his bachelors in Criminal Law. After that, he earned his second bachelors degree from faculty of Law and Political Science of Kabul University.

Hamidi obtained his first masters' degree with a concentration in Criminal Law from Islamic Azad University based in Kabul and his second Masters' from Harvard University in Public Administration.

Career

Committee appointments
Hamidi was appointed as a member of the Election Committee of Emergency (Loya Jirga) and focal point for four provinces namely: Kandahar, Zabul, Helmand, and Uruzgan as per decree of the Head of interim administration in 2002. At the same time, he was appointed as the temporary secretary of the Emergency Loya Jirga. Again in 2002, he was appointed as a member of Independent Human Rights Commission of Afghanistan. Besides all these responsibilities, Hamidi was appointed as a member of Independent Election Complaint Commission as per decree of President of Afghanistan in 2005 and worked in this position for more than a year. In addition, Hamidi worked as a member of Reporting Committee of Government to International Conventions and Universal Periodic Review Committee as per a presidential decree.

He has also worked as advisor for the Ministry of Youth Affairs, and for six years as the Director of the Presidential Advisory Board to Appoint High Officials of the Government.

In 2014, he was appointed as Ambassador against Torture in Afghanistan by the Asia-Pacific Assembly.

Hamidi has participated in numerous international and national conferences on Rule of Law, Elections, Judicial and Justice Reforms, and Good Governance, and has delivered speeches in this role.

Attorney General 
Mohammad Farid Hamidi was appointed in 2016 as Attorney General of Afghanistan by President Ashraf Ghani. Hamidi served his country by supporting the rule of law, reformation, and human rights. He also focused on civic values and fighting against corruption, inequality, injustice, and violence against women and children in Afghanistan.

In 2021, after serving in Afghanistan's justice sector for six years, Hamidi resigned his position as Attorney General of Afghanistan.

References 

1967 births
Living people
Afghan lawyers
Judiciary of Afghanistan
Harvard University alumni
Islamic Azad University alumni